Johann Baptist Peyer, also spelt Bayer or Beyer (c.1678–1733) was an Austrian organist and composer. He may have been educated at Heiligenkreuz Abbey, where he was organist and music teacher from 1698. From about 1712 he worked for Empress Eleonore, widow of the Holy Roman Emperor Leopold I. After she died in 1720, he worked at the court chapel under Johann Joseph Fux.

Works 
about 100 works for organ or haspsichord (preludes, fugues, capriccios, toccatas)
partita in C major for harpsichord
Benedictio Mensae et gratiarum Actio post mensam for choir, strings and organ (with Clemens Scheupflug)

References
 

1670s births
1733 deaths
Composers from Vienna
Austrian Baroque composers